Battlefield was a professional wrestling event produced by New Japan Pro-Wrestling (NJPW). It took place on January 4, 1994 in the Tokyo Dome. The show drew 48,000 spectators. 

Unlike the previous two years' January 4 events the 1994 show was not a co-promotion with World Championship Wrestling (WCW) although it did feature former WCW wrestlers The Steiner Brothers (Rick and Scott), who were working for WCW's rival, the World Wrestling Federation (WWF), at the time. The show also featured Brutus Beefcake and Hulk Hogan before they began working with WCW, working freelance for NJPW for one night.

The show featured 11 matches in total, including two title matches that saw The Hell Raisers (Hawk and Power Warrior) defeat The Jurassic Powers (Hercules Hernandez and Scott Norton) to win the IWGP Tag Team Championship, while Shinya Hashimoto successfully defended the IWGP Heavyweight Championship against Masahiro Chono. The show also featured a Mask vs. Mask match where Tiger Mask was unmasked and revealed as Koji Kanemoto.

Production

Background
The January 4 Tokyo Dome Show is NJPW's biggest annual event and has been called "the largest professional wrestling show in the world outside of the United States" and the "Japanese equivalent to the Super Bowl".

Storylines
Battlefield featured professional wrestling matches that involved different wrestlers from pre-existing scripted feuds and storylines. Wrestlers portrayed villains, heroes, or less distinguishable characters in scripted events that built tension and culminated in a wrestling match or series of matches.

Results

References

External links
NJPW.co.jp 

1994 in professional wrestling
1994 in Tokyo
Battlefield 
January 1994 events in Asia